Rio Hillen (born 5 March 2003) is a Dutch professional footballer who plays as a centre-back for Eerste Divisie club De Graafschap.

Club career
A youth product of AZ Alkmaar, Hillen signed with Ajax on 11 June 2019. Hillen made his professional debut with Jong Ajax in a 5–1 Eerste Divisie win over MVV on 23 October 2020.

On 22 June 2022, Hillen signed a two-year contract with De Graafschap.

International career
Born in the Netherlands, Hillen is of Brazilian descent through his mother. He is a youth international for the Netherlands.

References

External links
 
 OnsOranje U15 Profile
 OnsOranje U17 Profile

2003 births
Living people
Footballers from Amsterdam
Dutch footballers
Netherlands youth international footballers
Dutch people of Brazilian descent
Association football defenders
Eerste Divisie players
Jong Ajax players
De Graafschap players